

Football career

On 29 January 2017, Rafael Broetto signed a three-and-a-half contract with Marítimo

Played in lithuanian FC Stumbras, later return to Portugal in Marítimo.

In summer 2019 became a member of Lithuanian FK Panevėžys.

References

Living people
Brazilian footballers
C.S. Marítimo players
Primeira Liga players
Brazilian expatriate footballers
Expatriate footballers in Portugal
Brazilian expatriate sportspeople in Portugal
Association football goalkeepers
Year of birth missing (living people)